Threlfall is a surname. Notable people with the surname include:

 David Threlfall (born 1953), English actor
 Dick Threlfall (1916–1994), English footballer
 Edward Threlfall, English footballer in the 1900s
 George Threlfall (engineer) (1819–1897), English-born Australian engineer and entrepreneur
 George Threlfall (footballer) (1899–1988), Australian rules footballer
 Jeanette Threlfall (1821–1880), English hymnwriter, religious poet
 Mary Threlfall (1910–1996), Australian nurse
 Philip Threlfall (born 1967), English cricketer
 Sir Richard Threlfall (1861–1932), English chemist and engineer
 Robbie Threlfall (born 1988), English footballer
 T. R. Threlfall (1852–after 1932), English trade unionist and politician
 Wilf Threlfall  (1906–1988), English footballer
 William Threlfall (1888–1949), German mathematician